Afro Samurai 2: Revenge of Kuma is a third-person action-adventure video game published by Versus Evil and developed by Redacted Studios. The game was released for the PlayStation Network and Microsoft Windows in September 2015, with an Xbox One version planned for October. The sequel to 2009's Afro Samurai, originally a manga series by Takashi Okazaki, the player controls Kuma, a swordsman who seeks revenge on the titular character.

The game received widely negative reviews from critics. Originally planned to be released in three volumes, Versus Evil removed Revenge of Kuma from all platforms, issued refunds, and canceled the other two volumes. The Xbox One version was also never released, while the PlayStation 4 version is one of the few titles from that platform to not be backward compatible with the PlayStation 5.

Gameplay
Similar to the first installment, Afro Samurai 2 is a third-person action game where the player must work through a series of areas taking down waves of enemies. Learning different movies and combos and key to getting through the game. In addition to combat.

Plot
In Afro Samurai 2, Afro once again fights Kuma who is challenging him for his Number One headband.

Development
Afro Samurai 2 was developed by Redacted Studios and published by Versus Evil. After the release of the original Afro Samurai game in 2009, former Namco Bandai senior producer David Robinson left the company and founded Redacted. Along with leaving Namco Bandai, he secured the rights to make other games in the series.

Afro Samurai 2s story was written by Jim DeFelice, co-writer of American Sniper. The soundtrack to the game was done by rapper RZA, who also produced two soundtrack albums of the animated series. The game's still image cutscenes was done by series creator Takashi Okazaki.

The game was released for the PlayStation Network and Microsoft Windows on September 22, 2015. An Xbox One version was also planned to be released on October 9, but was canceled due to poor reception on the other platforms.

Reception

Upon release, Afro Samurai 2: Revenge of Kuma received widely negative reviews from critics.

Polygon called it one of the worst games of 2015. Giant Bomb called it the worst game of the year. It was the second worst-reviewed game of 2015 according to aggregate review website Metacritic.

Withdrawal and cancelled trilogy
In November 2015, Afro Samurai 2 was pulled from the PSN and Steam. In an interview with CGMagazine on the game's withdrawal, Versus Evil's Steve Escalante called the game "a failure" and announced the cancellation of the other two volumes and refunds for customers. Escalante later expanded on the decision in an interview with Gamasutra, saying, "Given the game quality was not what people were expecting, it didn't sell like hot cakes, let's just put it like that."

References

External links
 

2015 video games
Cancelled Xbox One games
PlayStation 4 games
Single-player video games
Video games about bears
Video games about samurai
Video games based on anime and manga
Video games developed in the United States
Video games featuring black protagonists
Windows games
Versus Evil games